Mark T. Sullivan (born 1958) is an American author who writes mystery, suspense and historical fiction novels. His fourteen published works that are written solely by him include The Fall Line, The Purification Ceremony, Triple Cross, Rogue and the USA Today and Washington Post bestselling novel, Beneath a Scarlet Sky.
He has also written, as of June 2016, five novels with James Patterson.

Biography and career 

Sullivan was born and raised in Medfield, Massachusetts, a suburb of Boston. He earned a BA in English from Hamilton College in 1980. After graduating, he served as a volunteer in the Peace Corps, teaching English to children of Tuareg nomads in the Sahara Desert.

Sullivan returned to the United States in 1982 and studied at the Medill School of Journalism of Northwestern University in Evanston, Illinois.

He began writing fiction at 30 and his first novel, The Fall Line (1994), was a New York Times Notable Book of the Year.

His 2017 novel, Beneath a Scarlet Sky, was optioned in 2017 by Pascal Pictures with actor Tom Holland attached to star in the lead role.

Books 

 The Fall Line (1994), 
 Hard News (1995), 
 The Purification Ceremony (1996), 
 Ghost Dance (1995), 
 Labyrinth (2001), 
 The Serpent's Kiss (2003), 
 Triple Cross (2009), 
 Rogue (October 2012, ebook 2011), 
Private Games (January 2012)  (written with James Patterson)
Private Berlin (January 2013)  (written with Patterson)
 Outlaw (October 2013) 
Private L.A. (February 2014)  (written with Patterson)
 Thief (December 2014) 
Private Paris (March 2016)  (written with Patterson)
 The Games: A Private Novel (June 2016)   (written with Patterson)
The Second Woman (2017) 
 Beneath a Scarlet Sky (2017), 
 The Last Green Valley (2021),

References 

 Goodreads website, at http://www.goodreads.com/author/show/127642.Mark_T_Sullivan .
 Walmart website, at http://www.walmart.com/tp/mark-t-sullivan .
 Bookreporter.com website, at https://web.archive.org/web/20141220025511/http://www.bookreporter.com.asp1-14.dfw1-2.websitetestlink.com/authors/au-sullivan-mark.asp .

External links 
 

American male journalists
American thriller writers
Living people
Medill School of Journalism alumni
Hamilton College (New York) alumni
American male novelists
20th-century American novelists
21st-century American novelists
People from Medford, Massachusetts
Novelists from Massachusetts
Peace Corps volunteers
20th-century American male writers
21st-century American male writers
20th-century American non-fiction writers
21st-century American non-fiction writers
1958 births